Seeds of Hope was a plowshares group of women who damaged a BAE Hawk warplane at the British Aerospace Warton Aerodrome site near Preston, England, in 1996. Their aim was to stop the aircraft being exported to the Indonesian military, for use in the illegally occupied country of East Timor. They left a video and booklet in the cockpit of the aircraft in order to explain their motivation.

Direct action

On the 29 January 1996, Andrea Needham, Joanna Wilson and Lotta Kronlid broke into BAE's Warton Aerodrome at Warton and caused £1.7m worth of damage to Hawk tail number ZH955, a warplane that was to have been supplied, along with 23 others, to the New Order regime of Indonesia. In the tradition of plowshares actions, they stayed at the site until they were found by security. They were arrested for criminal damage and conspiracy to commit criminal damage. A week later, a fourth woman, Angie Zelter, was also arrested and charged with conspiracy. The four spent six months on Remand in HMP Risley before coming to trial in Liverpool Crown Court in July 1996.

Trial
Accused of causing, and conspiring to cause, criminal damage, with a maximum ten-year sentence, they argued that what they did was not a crime but that they "were acting to prevent British Aerospace and the British Government from aiding and abetting genocide", referring to the one taking place in East Timor. They were found not guilty of criminal damage at Liverpool Crown Court, after a jury deemed their action was reasonable under the Genocide Act 1969.

References

Direct action
Peace organisations based in the United Kingdom
People acquitted of crimes
1996 in England
Pacifists
Genocide prevention
Aircraft manufactured in the United Kingdom